The Direction de l'Aviation Civile (DAC) is a government agency of Luxembourg, headquartered in Luxembourg City.

The law of 19 May 1999 created the DAC.

See also
 Administration for Technical Investigations

References

External links
  Direction de l'Aviation Civile
Aviation in Luxembourg
Government of Luxembourg